Peabody Memorial Tower, also known as the Singing Tower, is a historic structure located at North Manchester, Wabash County, Indiana. It was designed by architect Charles R. Weatherhogg and built in 1937.  The structure consists of a cube shaped limestone mausoleum at the base topped by a brick and limestone carillon that reaches 110 feet tall.  It has streamlined Art Deco character with Tudor Revival features.

It was listed on the National Register of Historic Places in 2010.

References

Monuments and memorials on the National Register of Historic Places in Indiana
Art Deco architecture in Indiana
Second Empire architecture in Indiana
Buildings and structures completed in 1937
Buildings and structures in Wabash County, Indiana
National Register of Historic Places in Wabash County, Indiana